The Night Won't Talk is a 1952 British crime film directed by Daniel Birt and starring John Bailey, Hy Hazell and Mary Germaine. The murder of an artist's model leads the police to investigate the artistic community of Chelsea.

It was made at Kensington Studios as a second feature. The film's sets were designed by the art director Bernard Robinson.

Cast
 John Bailey as Clayton Hawkes  
 Hy Hazell as Theodora Castle  
 Mary Germaine as Hazel Carr  
 Sarah Lawson as Sue / Susan  
 Elwyn Brook-Jones as Martin Soames  
 Ballard Berkeley as Inspector West  
 Hélène Burls as Mrs. Vincent  
 Leslie Weston 
 Grey Blake 
 Duncan Lamont as Sergeant Robbins  
 Raymond Young 
 Susan Pearson

Critical reception
TV Guide wrote, "Though a touch predictable, this film is fairly intelligent for a minor crime thriller."

References

Bibliography
 Chibnall, Steve & McFarlane, Brian. The British 'B' Film. Palgrave MacMillan, 2009.

External links

1952 films
British crime films
1952 crime films
Films directed by Daniel Birt
Films shot at Kensington Studios
Films set in London
British black-and-white films
1950s English-language films
1950s British films